Aladdin and His Lamp is a 1952 film directed by Lew Landers and starring Johnny Sands and Patricia Medina.

Plot 
A poor young man finds a lamp with a genie trapped inside. The genie promises to grant the man three wishes if he frees him from the lamp.

Cast
Johnny Sands as Aladdin 
Patricia Medina as Princess Jasmine
Charles Horvath as Genie

Production
Filming started 1 August 1951. Medina went into making Captain Pirate the week after.

References

External links

1950s fantasy adventure films
American fantasy adventure films
Films directed by Lew Landers
Films based on Aladdin
Films produced by Walter Wanger
1950s English-language films
1950s American films